Chingongo is an Angolan commune .  It belongs to the municipality of Ganda , in the province of Benguela .

References 

Populated places in Benguela Province
Municipalities of Angola